Dennis Joseph O'Toole (born March 13, 1949) is an American former professional baseball player. A right-handed relief pitcher and the younger brother (by 12 years) of  National League All-Star lefthander Jim O'Toole, Dennis appeared in 15 Major League games spread over five seasons (1969–1973) for the Chicago White Sox.

In 30⅓ MLB innings pitched, O'Toole gave up 43 hits and ten bases on balls, with 22 strikeouts and no saves. He yielded 17 earned runs for a career ERA of 5.04. He compiled a 53–39 (3.66) mark in 211 minor league games, mostly in the White Sox' farm system, over nine seasons (1967–1975).  His MLB career did not overlap with Jim's, who hurled his last big league game with the ChiSox over two years before Dennis' debut.

References

External links

Baseball Reference (Minors)
Baseball Gauge
Retrosheet
Venezuelan Professional Baseball League

1949 births
Living people
Alijadores de Tampico players
American expatriate baseball players in Mexico
Appleton Foxes players
Asheville Tourists players
Baseball players from Chicago
Chicago White Sox players
Duluth-Superior Dukes players
Gulf Coast White Sox players
Iowa Oaks players
Leones del Caracas players
American expatriate baseball players in Venezuela
Major League Baseball pitchers
Mexican League baseball pitchers
Mobile White Sox players
Oklahoma City 89ers players
Sacramento Solons players
Tucson Toros players
Xavier University alumni